Bardhaman Sadar South subdivision is an administrative subdivision of the Purba Bardhaman district in the state of West Bengal, India.Great revolutionary Rash behari Bose was born in village Subaldaha.This village is under this sub division.

Overview
Bardhaman Sadar South subdivision is spread over partly across the Bardhaman Plain in the central part of the district and partly across Khandaghosh Plain in the south-eastern part of the district.

Subdivisions
Purba Bardhaman district is divided into the following administrative subdivisions:

Administrative units

Bardhaman Sadar South subdivision has  5 police stations, 6 community development blocks, 6 panchayat samitis, 58 gram panchayats, 643 mouzas, 624 inhabited villages, 1 municipality and 2 census towns. The single municipality is at Memari. The census towns are: Alipur and Seharabazar. The subdivision has its headquarters at Memari.

Demographics
As per the 2011 Census of India data Bardhaman Sadar South subdivision, after bifurcation of Bardhaman district in 2017, had a total population of 1,198,155. There were 609,720 (51%) males and 588,435 (49%) females. Population below 6 years was 124,639.

As per the 2011 census data the total number of literates in Bardhaman Sadar South subdivision, after bifurcation of Bardhaman district in 2017, was 825,408 (76.89% of the population over 6 years) out of which males numbered 455,002 (83.29% of the male population over 6 years) and females numbered 370,406 (70.13% of the female population over 6 years).

See also – List of West Bengal districts ranked by literacy rate

In the 2011 census Hindus numbered 909,092 and formed 75.87% of the population in Bardhaman Sadar South subdivision. Muslims numbered 269,759 and formed 22.51% of the population. Christians numbered 1,278 and formed 0.11% of the population. Others numbered 18,026 and formed 1.50% of the population.

Police stations
Police stations in Bardhaman Sadar South subdivision have the following features and jurisdiction:

Blocks
Community development blocks in Bardhaman Sadar South subdivision are:

Gram panchayats
The subdivision contains 58 gram panchayats under 6 community development blocks:

 Khandaghosh block consists of ten gram panchayats, viz. Berugram, Khandaghosh, Shankari–I, Ukhrid, Gopalbera, Lodna, Shankari–II, Kaiyar, Sagrai and Sasanga.
 Jamalpur block consists of 13 gram panchayats, viz. Abujhati–I, Chakdighi, Jarogram, Paratal–II, Abujhati–II, Jamalpur–I, Jyotsreeram, Ajhapur, Jamalpur–II, Panchrah, Berugram, Jaugram, Paratal–I.
 Memari–I block consists of ten gram panchayats, viz. Amadpur, Daluibazar–II, Gop–Gantar–I, Nimo–II, Bagila, Debipur, Gop–Gantar–II, Daluibazar–I, Durgapur and Nimo–I.
 Memari–II block consists of nine gram panchayats, viz. Bara Palasan–I, Bijur–II, Kuchut, Bara Palasan–II, Bohar–I, Satgachhia–I, Bijur–I, Bohar–II, Satgachhia–II.
 Raina–I block consists of eight gram panchayats, viz. Hijalna, Narugram, Palsona, Sehara, Mugura, Natu, Raina and Shyamsundar.
 Raina–II block consists of eight gram panchayats, viz. Arui, Gotan, Pahalanpur, Painta–II, Barabainan, Kaiti, Painta–I and Uchalan.

Economy

Agriculture
In the erstwhile Bardhaman district agriculture was the pre-dominant economic activity and the main source of livelihood for the rural people.  The soil and climate favours the production of food grains. Cash crops are also grown. Irrigation facilities had contributed in a major way towards higher agricultural productivity. Amongst the districts of West Bengal, Bardhaman district had maximum irrigated land under cultivation. Given below is an overview of the agricultural production (all data in tonnes) for Bardhaman Sadar North subdivision, other subdivisions and the Purba Bardhaman district, after bifurcation of the erstwhile Bardhaman district, with data for the year 2013–14.

Education
Given in the table below (data in numbers) is a comprehensive picture of the education scenario in Purba Bardhaman district, after bifurcation of Bardhaman district in 2017, with data for the year 2013-14:

Note: Primary schools include junior basic schools; middle schools, high schools and higher secondary schools include madrasahs; technical schools include junior technical schools, junior government polytechnics, industrial technical institutes, industrial training centres, nursing training institutes etc.; technical and professional colleges include engineering colleges, medical colleges, para-medical institutes, management colleges, teachers training and nursing training colleges, law colleges, art colleges, music colleges etc. Special and non-formal education centres include sishu siksha kendras, madhyamik siksha kendras, centres of Rabindra mukta vidyalaya, recognised Sanskrit tols, institutions for the blind and other handicapped persons, Anganwadi centres, reformatory schools etc.

The following institutions are located in Bardhaman Sadar South subdivision:
Memari College was established at Memari in 1981.
Jamalpur Mahavidyalaya was established at Jamalpur in 2010.
Shyamsundar College was established at Shyamsundar in 1948.
Sir Rashbehari Ghosh Mahavidyalaya was established at Ukhrid in 2010.
Acharya Sukumar Sen Mahavidyalaya has been established at Gotan
Radha Gobinda B Ed Teacher Training College was established at Jhapandanga, PO Keotara.

Healthcare
The table below (all data in numbers) presents an overview of the medical facilities available and patients treated in the hospitals, health centres and sub-centres in 2014 in Purba Bardhaman district, after bifurcation of the erstwhile Bardhaman district in 2017, with data for the year 2013–14.

Medical facilities available in Bardhaman Sadar South subdivision are as follows:

Rural Hospitals: (Name, CD block, location, beds)
Memari Rural Hospital, Memari municipality, Memari, 60 beds
Paharhati Rural Hospital, Memari II CD block, Paharhati, 30 beds
Jamalpur Rural Hospital, Jamalpur CD block, Jamalpur, 30 beds
Maheshbati Rural Hospital, Raina I CD block, Maheshbati, 30 beds
Madhabdihi Rural Hospital, Raina II CD block, Madhabdihi, PO Chhoto-bainan, 30 beds
Block Primary Health Centres: (Name, block, location, 30 beds
Khandaghosh BPHC, Khandaghosh CD Block, Khandaghosh, 15 beds
Primary Health Centres: (CD block-wise)(CD block, PHC location, beds)
Memari I CD block: Debipur (10), Durgapur, PO Chotkharda (10), Palla Road (10)
Memari II CD block: Barapalasan (6), Bitra (10), Bohar (6)
Jamalpur CD block: Chakdighi (10), Chaksmanjari (10), Illasora (4), Nabagram (4)
Raina I CD block: Meral (4), Narugram (6), Shyamsundar (10)
Raina II CD block: Binodpur, PO Bajekamarpur (2), Gotan (6), Kaity (10), Painta (4), Subaldaha, PO Barabainan (10)
Khandaghosh CD block: Khudkuri, PO Sankari (4), Kuley (Gayeshpur), PO Chagram (10), Torkona (4)

Electoral constituencies
Lok Sabha (parliamentary) and Vidhan Sabha (state assembly) constituencies in Bardhaman Sadar South subdivision were as follows:

References

Subdivisions of West Bengal
Subdivisions in Purba Bardhaman district